Distillers' Company may mean:

 The Distillers Company, a business which produced Scotch whisky
 The Worshipful Company of Distillers, a City of London Livery Company